Sheikh Mamun Khaled OSP, SUP is a retired  lieutenant general of Bangladesh Army and former commandant of National Defence College.

Career
Mamun Khaled was a signal corps officer of Bangladesh army. He served as the Director General of Directorate General of Forces Intelligence for 3 years from 2011 to 2013. He was then made the Vice-Chancellor of the Army run Bangladesh University of Professionals. He earned the Chancellor Gold Medal for his PhD, he was the first person to complete PhD in Bangladesh University of Professionals.

Mamun Khaled served in a number of different positions in Bangladesh Army. He was an instructor at Military Intelligence School, Army Headquarters, Colonel Staff of an Infantry Division, Commandant of the School of Military Intelligence, Area Commander Logistic Area. Prior to assuming as the Commandant, National Defence College of Bangladesh, he was also commandant of Bangladesh Ordnance Factories.

The General also served in the UN Protection Force (UNPROFOR) in Bosnia and UN Mission in Sierra Leone (UNAMSIL). He is the first foreign recipient who had been awarded a fellowship from the United Service Institution (USI) of India for his great contribution to the Military Leadership.

References

Living people
Bangladesh Army generals
Directors General of the Directorate General of Forces Intelligence
Year of birth missing (living people)
Bangladesh University of Professionals alumni
Vice-Chancellors of Bangladesh University of Professionals